The Baudin Peaks are a group of peaks rising above , standing at the southeast corner of Mikkelsen Bay, immediately southwest of the mouth of Clarke Glacier, and  east-northeast of Cape Berteaux, on the west coast of Graham Land. This general area was first sighted and roughly charted in 1909 by the French Antarctic Expedition under Jean-Baptiste Charcot, who gave the name "Cap Pierre Baudin" to a cape in this vicinity. The peaks themselves were roughly surveyed in 1936 by the British Graham Land Expedition under John Rymill, but no name was assigned to them. They were resurveyed in 1948–49 by the Falkland Islands Dependencies Survey, who subsequently identified them as the feature named "Cap Pierre Baudin" by Charcot. Charcot gave the name for Pierre Baudin, then port engineer at Pernambuco (now Recife), where the Pourquoi-Pas put in on her return from the Antarctic.

References 

Mountains of Graham Land
Fallières Coast